Novokostsy is a rural locality (a village) in Denisovskoye Rural Settlement, Gorokhovetsky District, Vladimir Oblast, Russia. The population was 1 as of 2010.

Geography 
Novokostsy is located on the Ilinda River, 24 km southwest of Gorokhovets (the district's administrative centre) by road. Korovkino is the nearest rural locality.

References 

Rural localities in Gorokhovetsky District